In enzymology, a pyranose oxidase is an enzyme that catalyzes the chemical reaction

D-glucose + O2  2-dehydro-D-glucose + H2O2

Thus, the two substrates of this enzyme are D-glucose and O2, whereas its two products are 2-dehydro-D-glucose and H2O2.

Pyranose oxidase is able to oxidize D-xylose, L-sorbose, D-galactose, and D-glucono-1,5-lactone, which have the same ring conformation and configuration at C-2, C-3 and C-4.

This enzyme belongs to the family of oxidoreductases, specifically those acting on the CH-OH group of donor with oxygen as acceptor. The systematic name of this enzyme class is pyranose:oxygen 2-oxidoreductase. Other names in common use include glucose 2-oxidase, and pyranose-2-oxidase. This enzyme participates in pentose phosphate pathway. It employs one cofactor, FAD.

Structural studies

Use in biosensors 
Recently, pyranose oxidase has been gaining on popularity within biosensors. Unlike glucose oxidase, it can produce higher power output, given that it is not glycosylated, has more favorable value of Michaelis-Menten constants, and can catalytically convert both anomers of glucose. It reacts with a wider range of substrates. Pyranose oxidase does not cause an unwanted pH shift. It is also possible to easily express and produce it in high yields using E. coli.

References

Further reading 

 
 
 

EC 1.1.3
Flavoproteins
Enzymes of known structure